Deepika Kamaiah is an Indian model turned film actress. She has appeared in South Indian films in addition to Bollywood films. Kamaiah has been a finalist of Femina Miss India. She took part in Bigg Boss Kannada in the second season.

Personal life
Nandineravanda Deepika Kamaiah, a Kodavathi, was born in Bangalore. Her mother is a school teacher and teaches Kannada. Deepika Kamaiah is an alumnus of Kendriya Vidyalaya Hebbal, Bangalore, and completed her B.com from Bishop Cotton Women's Christian College in 2009.

Career

Modelling and film
She began her modelling career while she was studying her class 11. She went on to become one of the finalists in the Femina Miss India South beauty pageant in 2009. She also won the Lycra MTV Style Awards in 2010. While she was juggling between her modeling assignments and studies, a film offer came through from a Tamil director, Kulaindai Veerappan for his directorial, Aanmai Thavarael. Her role, however, went unnoticed without any recognition from the critics.

Breakthrough
Kamaiah landed her first major role through the Kannada film Chingari (2012), an adaptation of Taken, directed by Harsha. She acted alongside Darshan and Bhavana in the lead role. The film, centered around human trafficking went on to be one of the highest-grossing films for the year. Her portrayal of Geetha, trapped under human trafficking earned her favorable reviews with Rediff commenting "Deepika comes as a whiff of fresh air and does an adequate job for a newcomer". The NDTV Movies reviewer praised her for her "hardwork to make her presence felt". Following this success, she was offered many films in Tamil, Telugu and Kannada languages. She accepted a role as the protagonist for the film Neene Bari Neene directed by Deepak Thimmaiah.

She also subsequently signed for the upcoming film Auto Raja which also stars Ganesh and Bhama in the lead roles. She is also making her Bollywood debut in the Rajkumar Santoshi directorial Phata Poster Nikla Hero which stars Shahid Kapoor and Ileana D'Cruz. Kamaiah plays a cameo as a village girl and would be seen in the initial portions of the film

Filmography

See also

List of Indian film actresses

References

External links

Year of birth missing (living people)
Living people
21st-century Indian actresses
Actresses from Bangalore
Actresses in Hindi cinema
Actresses in Kannada cinema
Actresses in Tamil cinema
Female models from Bangalore
Indian film actresses
Kannada actresses
Kendriya Vidyalaya alumni
Bigg Boss Kannada contestants